Percy Dermond (1919–2012) was a rugby league footballer in Australia's premier competition the New South Wales Rugby Football League (NSWRFL).

Playing career
A Winger, Dermond played for the Eastern Suburbs club in the years (1938–39), (1941–43) and (1946–47). In the 1941 Season Dermond, with a total of 13 tries for that year, was one, of three players, to be that season's leading try scorer.

Dermond played in two premierships deciders for Eastern Suburbs club. However, they lost both matches. In 1938 they were defeated by Canterbury-Bankstown in their maiden premiership victory and in 1941 they were defeated by St George, it was also their first premiership victory.

The winger played a total of 43 matches for the club, scoring a total of 43 tries and is officially recognised as the club's 259th player.

References

 The Encyclopedia Of Rugby League Players; Alan Whiticker & Glen Hudson

Australian rugby league players
Sydney Roosters players
2012 deaths
Rugby league players from Sydney
1919 births
Rugby league wingers
Sportsmen from New South Wales